The soldier beetles (Cantharidae) are relatively soft-bodied, straight-sided beetles. They are cosmopolitan in distribution. One of the first described species has a color pattern reminiscent of the red coats of early British soldiers, hence the common name. They are also known commonly as leatherwings because of their soft elytra.

Historically, these beetles were placed in a superfamily "Cantharoidea", which has been subsumed by the superfamily Elateroidea; the name is still sometimes used as a rankless grouping, including the families Cantharidae, Lampyridae, Lycidae, Omethidae (which includes Telegeusidae), Phengodidae, and Rhagophthalmidae.

Soldier beetles often feed on both nectar and pollen as well as predating other small insects. The larvae are often active, velvety, often brightly-colored, and they feed on the ground, hunting snails and other small creatures.

Evolutionary history 
The oldest described member of the family is Molliberus from the Early Cretaceous (early Albian) aged El Soplao amber from Cantabria, Spain, belonging to the tribe Cantharini in the subfamily Cantharinae. Other described genera include 6 from the early Late Cretaceous (early Cenomanian) aged Burmese amber, with 5 belonging to Cantharinae and one to Malthininae, and Katyacantharis, from the Cenomanian aged Agdzhakend amber of Azerbaijan, suggested to belong to Cantharinae. Indeterminate specimens have been reported from the Aptian aged Koonwarra fossil bed of the Strzelecki Group, Australia and the Barremian aged Lebanese amber.

Subfamilies, tribes and selected genera
Five subfamilies are normally accepted:

Cantharinae 
 tribe Cantharini 
 Cantharis
 Rhagonycha
 tribe Podabrini
 Podabrus

Chauliognathinae 
 tribe Chauliognathini
 Belotus
 Chauliognathus
 tribe Ichtyurini
 Trypherus

Dysmorphocerinae 
 Afronycha Wittmer, 1949 - central-southern Africa
 Asilis Broun, 1893 - New Zealand
 Compsonycha
 Dysmorphocerus Solier, 1849
 Flabelloontelus
 Geigyella Wittmer, 1972 - New Guinea
 Hansasilis
 Heteromastix Boheman, 1858 - Australia
 Hyponotum
 Micronotum
 Neoontelus Wittmer, 1972 - New Zealand
 Oontelus Solier, 1849 - S. America
 Plectocephalon
 Plectonotum Gorham, 1891 - Americas

Malthininae 
 tribe Malchinini
 Macrocerus Motschulsky, 1845 - Europe (synonym Malchinus)
 tribe Malthinini
 Caccodes  Sharp, 1885 - Central America, Pacific islands
 Malthinellus Kiesenwetter, 1874 - Japan
 Malthinus Latreille, 1805 - Japan, Europe, N. America
 tribe Malthodini
 Frostia Bert. ex Guill.
 Malthodes Kiesenwetter, 1852 - mostly Europe, N. America & New Zealand
 †Archaeomalthodes Hsiao et al. 2016 Burmese amber, Myanmar, Cenomanian

Silinae 
 tribe Silini
 Cordylocera Guérin-Méneville, 1830
 Silis Charpentier, 1825
 tribe Tytthonyxini
 Tytthonyx LeConte, 1851

Reproduction

Large males of the soldier beetle exercise choice for larger females. Body size correlates with the abilities of males to secure females, and of females to evade males.

See also
 List of Cantharidae genera

References

External links

Delta key
 Keys for the identification of British Cantharidae

Biological pest control beetles

Articles containing video clips